Series 28 of Top Gear, a British motoring magazine and factual television programme, was broadcast in the United Kingdom on BBC Two during 2020, consisting of six episodes between 26 January and 1 March; the series' studio segments were filmed prior to the outbreak of the COVID-19 pandemic in the UK. The series was preceded by a feature-length special, involving a road trip by the presenters across Nepal, that was aired on 29 December 2019.

This series' highlights included the presenters competing in a Mexican off-road motorsport race, creating a home-made off-road vehicle, a second race between a high-speed car and a fighter jet, and a tribute to rally legend Colin McRae. The popularity of the show continued to improve after the previous series, leading to the BBC to announce after the series had concluded that the programme would be moved to BBC One for future series.

Production 
On 20 June 2019, after the first episode of Series 27 had aired, it was announced that McGuinness and Flintoff would return for another series alongside Harris. On 11 July 2019, it was announced that the trio would also return for a one-off Christmas special in Nepal, the first Top Gear special since the Patagonia Special five years earlier, and the first since the departure of Jeremy Clarkson, Richard Hammond and James May.

On 10 February 2020, it was announced that future series of Top Gear would air on BBC One, making this series the last to air on BBC Two. Production changes for the following series due to the COVID-19 pandemic also meant that this series was the last to feature the Star in a ... Car segment, and the last to be filmed in an indoor studio marking the end of features/concepts that had been ever present in the shows' format in Top Gear for 17 years since the relaunch of Top Gear in 2002, which was conceived by the shows' ex-presenter Jeremy Clarkson and its ex-executive producer Andy Wilman.

Episodes

References

External links

 Series 28 at the Internet Movie Database

2019 British television seasons
2020 British television seasons
Top Gear seasons